The Digital Media Factory is a multi-media design, production and post-production facility founded by Marty Collins and wife, Ginny Mitchell along with partners Ned Hearn and Brian Critchlow.  They are located in Santa Cruz, California in the former Wrigley Gum manufacturing facility located at 2809 Mission Street on the west end of Santa Cruz.

History 

Founded in 2004, the Digital Media Factory is a multi-business studio system that designs, develops, produces, replicates and distributes digital media products. The Factory and the companies working on the studio lot serve the digital media needs of business, education, government, entertainment and local communities.  The overall mission of Digital Media Factory is to build a factory that produces, markets and distributes digital educational and entertainment media products for a global marketplace.

Subsidiaries 
The Digital Media Factory has several subsidiary companies, including Eyetracktion, Digital Signage Factory, and the Digital Media Learning Foundation

Credits 
 
Some of the Digital Media Factory's credits include:
Blur (2007) - Feature Film
VoteVets.org, Wesley Clark and John Batiste (2007) - online ads
Girls From Santa Cruz (2003) - live concert DVD

Current Productions 

On The Road with Big John
Junk Art Scramble
Programming the Nation?
Santa Cruz Live
Nature Rangers

Awards 

Several awards include a San Jose Joey Award for Marty Collin's involvement as Director of Photography and Lighting in the movie The Dead Pit as well as a Joey Award for Industry Development.  Earlier awards include several Telly Awards for advertising and television.

References

External links
 Official Website : Multi-Business Studio System
 Digital Media Factory at the Internet Movie Database

Film production companies of the United States
Television and film post-production companies
Visual effects companies
Entertainment companies based in California
Companies based in Santa Cruz County, California
American companies established in 2004
Mass media companies established in 2004
2004 establishments in California